Labiobarbus leptocheilus is a species of ray-finned fish in the genus Labiobarbus found in the Mekong, Salween, Chao Phraya and Xe Bangfai basins, and from the Malay Peninsula, Sumatra, Java and Borneo.

References

leptocheilus
Fish described in 1842
Taxa named by Achille Valenciennes